Don Williams County Park is a park in Boone County, Iowa, north of Ogden.  It surrounds Don Williams Reservoir, which flooded during the construction of a dam. It is 600 acres and includes a 150-acre lake. The campground is open from April 15 to October 15.  The park is also the headquarters for Boone County Conservation. The Park is named after the singer Don Williams, the brother of Andy Williams; both are from Iowa.

References

Protected areas of Boone County, Iowa
County parks in Iowa